Prince Philip Glacier is an Antarctic glacier flowing south for about 20 nautical miles (37 km) between Cobham and Holyoake Ranges into Nimrod Glacier. Named by the New Zealand Antarctic Place-Names Committee (NZ-APC) for Prince Philip, Duke of Edinburgh, husband of Elizabeth II of the United Kingdom. The glacier was part of the Ross oregeny. It is approximately 48km in length.

References 

Glaciers of Oates Land